Friedrich Eduard Schulz (1799–1829, also known as Friedrich Edward Schulz) was a German philosopher and orientalist, who was one of the first to uncover evidence of the Kingdom of Urartu.

Research on Urartu 
In 1827, the French scholar Antoine-Jean Saint-Martin recommended that his government send Schulz, then a young professor at the University of Giessen, to the area around Lake Van in what is now eastern Turkey on behalf of the French Oriental Society. Schulz discovered and copied numerous cuneiform inscriptions, partly in Assyrian and partly in a hitherto unknown language. Schulz also re-discovered the Kelishin stele, bearing an Assyrian-Urartian bilingual inscription, located on the Kelishin pass on the current Iraqi-Iranian border. A summary account of his initial discoveries was published in 1828. Schultz remained in the region, and was murdered along with two Persian army officers and four of his servants by Kurds in 1829 near Başkale.

Schultz was murdered while in Kurdistan in 1829. After Schultz's death, his papers, containing 42 inscriptions found at Van Castle and in its neighborhood, were recovered and published in Paris in 1840. This was some of the first original information on Urartu to appear in Europe.

References

Further reading

Biography of F.E. Schulz

German archaeologists
1799 births
1829 deaths
German orientalists
Academic staff of the University of Giessen